is a Japanese manga artist. He is most known for his work with Kenji Nagatomo on Bartender, and its sequels Bartender à Paris and Bartender à Tokyo. He has also written among others, Sommelier, along with Shinobu Kaitani, La Sommelière, with Katsunori Matsui, and Oui Chef!, with Hiyoko Kobayashi.

References

External links

Manga artists
Living people
Year of birth missing (living people)